Kaisa Pöyry (1818–1892), was a Finnish cunning woman and herbalist. She was based in Ristiina and Savolax, but was widely reputed and attracted clients from large parts of Finland.

References

1818 births
1892 deaths
19th-century Finnish people
Cunning folk
People from Ristiina